This is a list of electoral results for the electoral district of Mindarie in Western Australian state elections.

Members for Mindarie

Election results

Elections in the 2000s

References

Western Australian state electoral results by district